Taraclia County was a county (Romanian: județ) in Moldova from 1999 to 2003. It was established on 22 October 1999. It borders Ukraine, Lăpușna County and Chișinău County. Its capital is the city of Taraclia.

Taraclia County had 26 localities.

Administrative organization
The county was divided into nine communes:
Albota de Jos, which included the villages of Albota de Jos, Balabanu, Hagichioi, and Hîrtop
Albota de Sus, which included the villages of Albota de Sus, Cealîc, Cortenul Nou, Roșița, Samurza, and Sofievca
Aluatu, which included the villages of Aluatu and Novosiolovca
Budăi, which included the villages of Budăi, Dermengi, and Musaitu
Cairaclia, which included the village of Cairaclia
Corten, which included the village of Corten
Tvardița, which included the village of Tvardița
Valea Perjei, which included the village of Valea Perjei
Vinogradovca, which included the villages of Vinogradovca, Chirilovca, Ciumai, Mirnoe, Orehovca, and Salcia

References

 Counties of Moldova, Statoids.com

Counties of Moldova
Counties of Bessarabia
1999 establishments in Moldova
2003 disestablishments in Moldova
States and territories established in 1999
States and territories disestablished in 2003